Up to Here is the debut studio album by Canadian rock band The Tragically Hip, released in September 1989.  It is one of the band's most successful albums, achieving Diamond status in Canada for sales of over a million copies, earning the band a Juno Award for Most Promising Artist, and also introduced fan-favourite songs such as "Blow at High Dough", "New Orleans Is Sinking", and "38 Years Old".  The album reached  on RPMs Canadian Albums Chart, and both "Blow at High Dough" and "New Orleans is Sinking" reached  on the RPM Canadian Content singles charts.

Background

The Tragically Hip toured extensively following their first release, the EP The Tragically Hip, which had earned considerable airplay on Canadian FM radio and the MuchMusic video station.  The band found an audience on US college radio as well and drew the attention of MCA representative Bruce Dickinson while performing at the CMJ New Music Festival in New York City in late 1988.  That December Dickinson travelled to Toronto to see the band perform at the Toronto Music Awards, and MCA signed the band later that month.

Dickinson recommended the band record in Memphis, Tennessee, with producer Don Smith.  The band entered Ardent Studios with a set of songs they had extensive experience playing live.  Smith and the band further developed the arrangements in the studio before recording.

Release and reception

Up to Here was released on 5 September 1989. It sold  copies within its first year in Canada and ranked 14th Canadian Content album for 1989, fifth for 1990, and first for 1991. The album went gold in Canada in January 1990 and platinum that March and later that year earned the band a Juno Award for Most Promising Artist. In 1999 Up to Here was awarded diamond status.

Up to Here was the band's first release in the US. The Tragically Hip's relative lack of success in the US has been a frequent topic by commenters and interviewers, to the irritation of members of the band.

The songs are credited to the whole band. The band's instrumentalists typically had the most influence on the music composition of the album while lead singer Gord Downie came up with his poetic lyrics separately, writing them in a notebook and incorporating them when the band was ready.

Singles

The hard-rocking lead single "Blow at High Dough" was released in April 1989, before the album's release. "Blow at High Dough" was the theme song to the CBC comedy drama Made in Canada (1998—2003).

In November 1989 the second single was released, "New Orleans Is Sinking", a loose jam piece which had been a key part the band's live shows. In the midst of "New Orleans" the band often débuted new songs or gave Downie the spotlight to improvise. Music videos were released for both "Blow at High Dough" and "New Orleans is Sinking".

Touring

The Tragically Hip went on tour from June 1989 prior to the album's release. The band continued to tour Canada and the US through 1990, and made its first European appearance at a sold-out headlining show in Rotterdam. The band gained a reputation for its energetic live shows and the enthusiasm of its fans.

The band introduced new material while touring which appeared on their next album Road Apples in 1991, along with numerous songs that, at the time, had never been officially released.

Track listing

Personnel

Band

 Gord Downie – vocals
 Rob Baker – guitar
 Gord Sinclair – bass, vocals
 Johnny Fay – drums
 Paul Langlois – guitar, vocals

Recording personnel

 Bruce Barris – engineer, mixing
 Jeff DeMorris – assistant engineer
 Paul Eberson – assistant engineer
 Stephen Marcussen – mastering
 Don Smith – engineer, mixing, producer
 Andy Udoff – assistant engineer

Other

 Jeanne Bradshaw – design
 Michael Going – photography

Year-end charts

Notes

References

Works cited

 
 
 
 
 
 
 
 
 
 
 
 
 
 
 

1989 debut albums
The Tragically Hip albums
MCA Records albums